Dwight Bennett may refer to:

 Dwight Bennett, pseudonym of D. B. Newton (1916–2013), American writer of westerns
 Dwight Henry Bennett (1917–2002), American aeronautical engineer